Oribella is a genus of mites belonging to the family Oribellidae.

The species of this genus are found in Europe.

Species:

Oribella adelaidae 
Oribella borealis 
Oribella canariensis 
Oribella castanea 
Oribella cornuta 
Oribella dentata 
Oribella fujikavae 
Oribella fujikawae 
Oribella magna 
Oribella matritensis 
Oribella pectinata

References

Sarcoptiformes
Acari genera